MCGS Huravee was originally INS Tillanchang, a  patrol vessel of the Indian Navy. The vessel was designed and constructed by Garden Reach Shipbuilders & Engineers in Kolkata, West Bengal. Tillanchang was named after Tillangchong Island sometimes also called Tillanchang and was commissioned into the Indian Navy on 17 March 2001. She was transferred to the Maldivian Coast Guard on 16 April 2006 as MCGS Huravee. As part of the transfer, technical and material assistance was provided by the Indian Navy for a period of three years. The Indian Navy also stationed a team of personnel for a preliminary period and on-the-job training of the Maldivian crew. Huravee was successfully refitted at Visakhapatnam Naval Dockyard in November 2018. The refit was an initiative by Indian Navy to boost its diplomatic outreach to friendly foreign navies in the Indian Ocean Region.

References 

Trinkat-class patrol vessels
Ships built in India
2000 ships